Urho Kekkonen National Park is a national park in Lapland, Finland, situated in area of municipalities of Savukoski, Sodankylä and Inari. Established in 1983 and covering , it is one of Finland's largest protected areas. It is named after Urho Kekkonen, late President and Prime Minister of Finland.

The Suomujoki river flows through the northern parts of the diverse park. The marked paths in its western part are an easy destination even for the inexperienced backpacker, whereas the wilderness is good for long and demanding trips.

Most trips to Urho Kekkonen National Park are started from the Kiilopää fell center, the Aittajärvi lake along the Suomujoki river, or Raja-Jooseppi, and backpackers usually end up nearby the Saariselkä fell line, for instance on the top of its highest fell, Sokosti. Reindeer herding is still a common livelihood in the area.

See also 
 List of national parks of Finland
 Protected areas of Finland
 Maanselka

References

External links
 
 
 Outdoors.fi – Urho Kekkonen National Park
 Visual day-by-day narrative of a trail crossing the national park

National parks of Finland
Protected areas of the Arctic
Protected areas established in 1983
Geography of Lapland (Finland)
Tourist attractions in Lapland (Finland)
Inari, Finland
Savukoski
Sodankylä
Urho Kekkonen